Bruce Arena (born September 21, 1951) is an American soccer coach who is the head coach and sporting director of the New England Revolution.

He is a member of the National Soccer Hall of Fame and the NJCAA Lacrosse Hall of Fame. Arena has had a long and distinguished coaching career and is considered to be one of the most successful coaches in North American soccer history, having won five College Cup titles and five MLS Cup titles. He was the United States national team head coach at the 1996 Summer Olympics, the 2002 FIFA World Cup and the 2006 FIFA World Cup, head coach of the New York Red Bulls, D.C. United, LA Galaxy, and the New England Revolution  in Major League Soccer, and coached Virginia Cavaliers men's soccer to several college soccer championships. He is the U.S. soccer team's longest-serving head coach.

Before beginning his coaching career, Arena was a goalkeeper for Cornell University, and earned one cap with the United States men's national soccer team.

Playing career

High school and college
Arena was born in Brooklyn, New York, to Italian immigrant parents (from Alicudi, Sicily), and grew up in the Long Island town of Franklin Square, New York, where he attended Carey High School. While he excelled at several sports, he was too small for American football, so he joined the school's soccer team as a defender. He moved into the goal when the starting goalkeeper was suspended after hitting another school's player during a game. While in high school, he also played a single season with local club Hota S.C. of New York City's Cosmopolitan Soccer League.

After graduation, he began his collegiate athletic career playing both lacrosse and soccer at Nassau Community College, a two-year college near his home. Arena was a 1970 and 1971 Honorable Mention All-American lacrosse player and an All-American soccer player. He was inducted into the National Junior College Hall of Fame in 2008. While at Nassau, he played soccer for head coach Bill Stevenson and goalkeeper coach Shep Messing, a future New York Cosmos goalkeeper. At the end of his two years with Nassau, Arena transferred to Cornell University in upstate New York where he was a 1972 Honorable Mention All American and a 1973 Second Team All American in lacrosse. He did not originally intend to play soccer, but injuries to the school's first and second string goalkeepers led to the men's soccer coach, Dan Wood, to recruit Arena into the team as its goalkeeper. Arena backstopped the Cornell Big Red soccer team to the 1972 NCAA Soccer Championship Final Four and earned Most Valuable Defensive Player honors for the tournament.

Professional
After Arena's graduation from Cornell, New York Cosmos drafted him in the fifth round of the North American Soccer League college draft. The Cosmos released him before the season.   Arena then signed to play professional lacrosse for the Montreal Quebecois, spending a single season with the team in 1975. The National Lacrosse League folded at the end of the 1975 season, leaving Arena unemployed. At the same time, Dan Wood, who had recruited Arena to play for the Cornell soccer team, had been named the new head coach of the expansion Tacoma Tides which played in the American Soccer League. Wood contacted Arena and convinced him to move to the Pacific Northwest in 1976 to play for him. While Arena was the second string goalkeeper behind starter Jamil Canal, the move to Tacoma was significant in that it introduced Arena to coaching. That year, in addition to playing for the Tides, Arena coached the men's soccer team at the University of Puget Sound, where he compiled a 5–7 record.

International
In 1973, he earned his only national team cap as a second-half substitute for Bob Rigby in a 2–0 loss to Israel. National team coach, Gordon Bradley, had called Arena into the national team for an earlier game against Haiti, but Arena could not get time off from his job teaching at a local junior high school. In addition to his single cap with the U.S. soccer team, Arena also played for the national lacrosse team which won the 1974 World Lacrosse Championship and finished runner up in 1978.

Coaching career

College
In 1977, Arena moved back to teach at Cornell and act as the school's assistant lacrosse coach. While he was there, the University of Virginia (UVA) advertised for two open coaching positions – head soccer coach and assistant lacrosse coach beginning the 1978 season. Arena took that opportunity and went on to coach both the UVA lacrosse and soccer teams for seven years, before becoming the school's dedicated soccer coach in 1985. Arena was the head coach of the Virginia program for eighteen years, during which he won five national championships (including 4 straight from 1991 to 1994) and amassed a 295–58–32 record, for a career NCAA mark of 300-65-32. Additionally, he coached and developed many players at Virginia who would go on to play significant roles in the United States national team, including Claudio Reyna, Jeff Agoos, Ben Olsen, John Harkes and Tony Meola. In addition to coaching, Arena served as the ACC soccer coaches chairman as well as two three-year terms on the NCAA Division I soccer committee from 1989 to 1995.

D.C. United
On January 3, 1996, Arena left UVA to become the coach of D.C. United of Major League Soccer. The 1996 season would be both the team's and the league's inaugural season, so Arena needed to build a team from scratch just like the other 9 MLS club managers. To make his position even more difficult, he had agreed to coach the U.S. U-23 national team at the 1996 Summer Olympics in Atlanta, where it went a disappointing 1–1–1. Despite the distraction of the Olympics, Arena managed to form his team and lead United to an improbable comeback victory in the first MLS Cup at Foxboro Stadium. In addition to the MLS title, Arena also took United to the 1996 U.S. Open Cup championship. Arena and United continued to experience success in 1997. The heavily favored team won its second MLS Cup at RFK Stadium defeating the surprise Western Conference champion Colorado Rapids 2–1. Arena's success led to his selection as the 1997 MLS Coach of the Year. This year, Arena took United to the semi-finals of the CONCACAF Champions' Cup. In 1998, Arena took United to its third consecutive MLS Cup only to see his team fall to the expansion Chicago Fire led by his protégé Bob Bradley. However, while Arena failed to add another MLS championship to his resume, he guided United to the CONCACAF Champions' Cup title with a 1–0 victory over Toluca on August 16, 1998. He followed that with a defeat of Brazilian club Vasco da Gama to take the Interamerican Cup title. Arena was also the 1997 and 1998 MLS All-Star head coach.

National team
Arena was hired by the U.S. national team to replace Steve Sampson as head coach in October 1998 following the team's disastrous showing in the 1998 FIFA World Cup. His first game in charge was a friendly against Australia in San Jose, California on November 6, 1998. He then forged the team into a successful international side, and is the most successful coach in United States history: most international wins; longest home shut-out; best World Cup showing since 1930, reaching the quarterfinals at the 2002 World Cup, before a defeat against Germany; and all-time best international FIFA Ranking (4th place, April 2006). Arena also won two Gold Cup championships in 2002 and 2005, with a third-place finish in 2003.

The 2002 World Cup was the high point of Arena's career as the U.S. coach. Heavy underdogs coming into the tournament, they stunned the world by beating a respected Portuguese team 3–2 in their opening game. Arena was lauded afterward for instilling in his players the confidence to play aggressively against an international powerhouse. A hard-fought tie against host nation South Korea was enough to qualify for the second round, despite a poor loss against Poland in the final group game. Arena and the U.S. met old nemesis Mexico in the Round of 16, and Arena adapted his tactics to secure a 2–0 victory and a quarterfinal berth. The U.S. switched from their usual 4–4–2 to a 3–5–2, and it paid dividends almost immediately when Josh Wolff, who Arena had brought in to fill out the formation, set up Brian McBride for the winning goal early in the first half. Arena switched the team back to a 4–4–2 for their quarterfinal against Germany, and the team continued to surprise many by dominating stretches of the game. However, they lost 1–0 on a Michael Ballack header, and there was a controversy with a penalty not awarded to the U.S. for a handball in the German penalty box.

The U.S. national squad fell short of expectations at the 2006 FIFA World Cup, finishing last in Group E with losses to the Czech Republic and Ghana. The United States scored only twice in its three games, a tie against eventual champion Italy on an own goal by Italian Cristian Zaccardo and a goal from Clint Dempsey against Ghana. Some, including former team member and ESPN analyst Eric Wynalda, have blamed the poor performance on questionable coaching decisions by Arena, including not playing Clint Dempsey and putting DaMarcus Beasley on the right wing instead of his favored left against the Czechs, and using a defensive 4–5–1 in the must-win match vs. Ghana which the U.S. eventually lost. Another questionable decision was made when Claudio Reyna became injured after the first goal when Arena subbed in defensive midfielder Ben Olsen to replace Reyna.

During his time as national team head coach, the United States rose in the FIFA world rankings from nineteenth to fourth, to the surprise, even, of U.S. players. Arena's 75 wins from 1998 to 2006 are by far the most in U.S. history. Nevertheless, three weeks after the Americans' disappointing first-round exit from the World Cup in Germany, the U.S. Soccer Federation announced that Arena's contract would not be renewed when it expired at the end of 2006. U.S. Soccer Federation president Sunil Gulati explained Arena's dismissal, stating that the U.S. was seeking a "fresh approach."

Arena was eventually replaced as national team coach by his close friend and former assistant at Virginia and D.C. United, Bob Bradley.

New York Red Bulls
After the US. national team, Arena pursued other coaching opportunities. That led to his being hired by Major League Soccer team New York Red Bulls. Arena's first match with the club came on August 12, 2006, in a friendly against FC Barcelona. On November 5, 2007, Red Bulls and Arena decided mutually to part company. During his year-and-a-half with the club, he went 16–16–10.  He had two years remaining on his contract with the club.

Los Angeles Galaxy
On August 18, 2008, Los Angeles Galaxy hired Arena to replace Ruud Gullit as head coach and Alexi Lalas as general manager. He inherited a team that had failed to make the playoffs since 2005 and would finish the 2008 season at 8–13–9, finishing next-to-last in the league and letting in a league-high 62 goals. During the offseason, Arena reshaped the defense, drafting Omar Gonzalez and A. J. DeLaGarza who became fixtures on the backline and bringing in Donovan Ricketts as the goalkeeper. Although the team scored only 36 goals in 2009, they also let in only 31. This led to a 12–6–12 record and second-place finish in the league standings. The Galaxy went to the playoffs and Arena was selected as the MLS Coach of the Year Award.

The 2011 Major League Soccer season went extremely well for Bruce's Galaxy.  His club won the Supporters' Shield for the second straight season, became only the third team in league history to reach the 60-point plateau, and won the 2011 MLS Cup in a 1–0 victory over the Houston Dynamo. Los Angeles also advanced to the elimination round of the CONCACAF Champions League. The Galaxy was, however, eliminated from the U.S. Open Cup in the quarterfinal stage. The club was undefeated in competitive matches at the Home Depot Center in 2011.

The 2012 Galaxy repeated winning the championship, again over Houston, despite a slow start to the year. He would win a third championship with the Galaxy in 2014 over the New England Revolution.

Return to the national team
On November 22, 2016, Arena was appointed as coach of the United States national team for the second time, replacing Jürgen Klinsmann after two disastrous losses in the first two matches of Hex qualifying round for the 2018 World Cup. On March 25, 2017, Arena led the USMNT to a trouncing 6–0 win over Honduras, followed by a 1–1 draw with Panama. On June 9, Arena led the USMNT to an important 2–0 win in a qualifying match against Trinidad and Tobago, followed by the USMNT's 3rd ever WCQ draw at Estadio Azteca against Mexico. In July, the U.S. won the 2017 CONCACAF Gold Cup 2–1 over Jamaica. Arena's team fell 0–2 to Costa Rica on September 1, but he coached the team to an impressive 4–0 rout of Panama on October 6 to get back into the qualifying third-place spot during the fifth round.

On October 10, the U.S. men's national team needed a draw against Trinidad and Tobago to qualify for the 2018 FIFA World Cup in Russia. The U.S. were heavy favorites coming in as Trinidad and Tobago had lost six straight games, but the team fell into a 0–2 hole with an Omar Gonzalez own-goal and an Alvin Jones goal. While Christian Pulisic pulled one back, the U.S. could not score again and lost to Trinidad and Tobago 1–2. With this loss, along with both Panama and Honduras beating their opponents, the U.S. fell to fifth place in the CONCACAF region's final qualifying round and failed to qualify for the FIFA World Cup for the first time since 1986. Three days after the team failed to qualify, Arena resigned from his position as men's national team head coach. He said, "We have no excuses, we failed today. We should have walked off this field with at least a point."

New England Revolution

Following his resignation from the national team, Arena was floated as a potential candidate for several coaching and managing positions, including for the Columbus Crew and the Scotland national team. He was named the head coach and sporting director of the New England Revolution on May 14, 2019, replacing Brad Friedel. His first game in charge came on June 2, in a 2–1 win over his former team, LA Galaxy. This win began an 11-match unbeaten run for New England, spurring them to their first MLS Cup Playoff appearance since 2014. The Revolution were eliminated in the first round of the 2019 MLS Cup Playoffs, in a 0–1 loss to Atlanta United. Arena's Revolution then advanced to the Eastern Conference Final in the 2020 MLS Cup Playoffs, losing 1–0 to the Columbus Crew.

Personal life
Arena has resided in the Los Angeles area with his wife Phyllis since taking over as LA Galaxy head coach, having previously been based out of Charlottesville, Virginia during most of his coaching career.

He has a brother, Michael, and a son, Kenny Arena, who played with the U.S. youth national team and in Major League Soccer before becoming a coach.

Coaching record

1.Record includes league, cup, playoffs and CONCACAF competitions. During his tenure as D.C. United head coach, all shootout wins were put into their own separate column and all shootout losses were put under the loss column. During his tenure as United States head coach, matches that end in a shootout are considered ties.

Honors

As a coach
D.C. United
MLS Cup (2): 1996, 1997
MLS Supporters' Shield: 1997
MLS Eastern Conference (3): 1996, 1997, 1998
U.S. Open Cup: 1996
CONCACAF Champions' Cup: 1998
Interamerican Cup: 1998

LA Galaxy
MLS Cup (3): 2011, 2012, 2014
MLS Supporters' Shield (2): 2010, 2011
MLS Western Conference (4): 2009, 2011, 2012, 2014

New England Revolution
MLS Supporters' Shield (1): 2021

University of Virginia
College Cup (5): 1989, 1991, 1992, 1993, 1994
ACC Men's Soccer Tournament (6): 1988, 1991, 1992, 1993, 1994, 1995

United States
CONCACAF Gold Cup (3): 2002, 2005, 2017

Individual
MLS Coach of the Year (4): 1997, 2009, 2011, 2021

As a player
Individual
NJCAA Lacrosse Hall of Fame: Class of 2008

See also
 List of Major League Soccer coaches

References

External links
Profile at soccertimes.com
ESPN feature on Arena, part I (part II) by Marc Connolly
Sports Illustrated profile by Grant Wahl
Associated Press profile by Ronald Blum
Article on Arena's visit to boyhood sites by Michael Lewis
Los Angeles Galaxy Head Coach

1951 births
Living people
American people of Italian descent
Sportspeople from Brooklyn
Soccer players from New York City
American soccer players
Association football goalkeepers
New York Hota players
Nassau Community College alumni
Cornell Big Red men's soccer players
Tacoma Tides players
American Soccer League (1933–1983) players
United States men's international soccer players
American soccer coaches
Cornell Big Red men's soccer coaches
Virginia Cavaliers men's soccer coaches
American Olympic coaches
D.C. United coaches
United States men's national soccer team managers
New York Red Bulls coaches
LA Galaxy coaches
New England Revolution coaches
Major League Soccer coaches
1999 FIFA Confederations Cup managers
2002 FIFA World Cup managers
2003 FIFA Confederations Cup managers
2006 FIFA World Cup managers
2017 CONCACAF Gold Cup managers
CONCACAF Gold Cup-winning managers
National Soccer Hall of Fame members
Association football commentators
Major League Soccer broadcasters
Lacrosse players from New York (state)
American lacrosse players
Cornell Big Red men's lacrosse players
American lacrosse coaches
Cornell Big Red men's lacrosse coaches
Virginia Cavaliers men's lacrosse coaches